HéGŭ L.I. 4 or simply Hegu (Korean: hap gok 합곡, Japanese: gō koku, Vietnamese: hợp cốc) is the fourth acupuncture point on the large intestine meridian (Hand Yang Ming) in traditional Chinese medicine.

This point is most noteworthy for its usefulness in stopping pain and for its capacity to cause the large intestine to contract, which can assist in moving bowels.

Traditional Chinese medicine
Acupuncture